The First Universal of the Ukrainian Central Council is a state-political act, the universal of the Central Council of Ukraine, which proclaimed the autonomy of Ukraine. Accepted  in Kyiv. The full name is the Universal of the Ukrainian Central Rada to the Ukrainian people, in Ukraine and beyond Ukraine.

Description 

At the end of May, the Central Rada sent a delegation to Petrograd headed by Volodymyr Vynnychenko and Mykola Kovalevskyi. The delegation demanded the Ukrainization of the army, administration, and schooling, as well as that the Provisional Government of Russia Republic express its principled attitude to the possibility of granting autonomy to Ukraine. It stated:

In the Universal it was emphasized that the Central Rada would "create a new system of free autonomous Ukraine."

The adoption of the First Universal forced the Provisional Government to send a delegation of ministers Tereshchenko and Tsereteli to Kyiv. They were later joined by Justice Minister Kerensky. On the Ukrainian side, Mykhailo Hrushevsky, Volodymyr Vynnychenko, and Simon Petliura took part in the talks. The result was the recognition of the Central Rada as the regional governing body in Ukraine. Russia's chauvinist circles were shocked by the "impudence" of Ukrainians - the First Universal. The caretaker government and the press competed in accusations of "betrayal", "separatism", "breakthrough of the front" and other deadly sins. On June 29, 1917, a delegation of the Provisional Government arrived in Kyiv. After two days of debate, a compromise was found - the Petrograd ministers agreed that the Ukrainian Central Rada draft a charter of Ukraine's autonomy on the condition that it be submitted for final approval by the All-Russian Constituent Assembly. Thus, the text of the new Universal was worked out, which was to be announced simultaneously with the Declaration of the Provisional Government in one day.

A stormy meeting of the Provisional Government took place in Petrograd, at which M. Tereshchenko and I. Tsereteli reported on their trip to Kyiv. The majority of the government still voted in favor of the agreement with Ukraine. The text of the agreement was telegraphed to V. Vynnychenko on July 3 (July 16 in the new style). The telegram confirmed the authority of the General Secretariat as a regional government with the expansion of its membership at the expense of representatives of minorities. The interim government of Russia also reaffirmed its commitment to "the development by the Central Council of a draft of the national and political status of Ukraine in such a sense that the Council itself will consider it in the interests of the region." The Provisional Government disagreed with only one thing: the Ukrainization of the army: "As for the Ukrainian military committees on the ground, they exercise their powers on a general basis," "the Provisional Government considers inadmissible measures that could disrupt the unity of organization and management of the army."

Anniversaries and memorable dates 
In 2017, the state level in Ukraine celebrated the anniversary - 100 years since the adoption of the First Universal of the Ukrainian Central Council (1917).

Document 
Typewritten copy from the newspaper publication ("Robitnycha Hazeta") and the Universal, stored in the Central State Archives of Ukraine, f. 1115, op. 1, file no. 4, pp. 5–8.

See also 

 Constitution of the Ukrainian People's Republic
 Universals
 Second Universal of the Ukrainian Central Council
 Third Universal of the Ukrainian Central Council
 Fourth Universal of the Ukrainian Central Council

 Unification Act
 Russian Constituent Assembly
 Ukrainian Constituent Assembly

References

External links 

 Кудлай О. Б. Перший Універсал Української Центральної Ради // Енциклопедія історії України : у 10 т. / редкол.: В. А. Смолій (голова) та ін. ; Інститут історії України НАН України. — Київ : Наукова думка, 2011. — Т. 8 : Па — Прик. — С. 172. — 520 с. : іл. — ISBN 978-966-00-1142-7.
 Перший універсал Української Центральної ради, 10 червня 1917 р. // ЦДАВО України, ф. 1115, оп. 1, спр. 4, арк. 5-8.
 Перший універсал Української Центральної ради, 10 червня 1917 р. // ЦДАВО України, ф. 1115, оп. 1, спр. 4, арк. 9.
 (І) Універсал Української Центральної Ради // Офіційна сторінка Верховної Ради України
 О. М. Мироненко. Перший Універсал Української Центральної Ради // Юридична енциклопедія: В 6 т. /Редкол.: Ю70 Ю. С. Шемшученко (голова редкол.) та ін. — К.: «Укр. енцикл.», 1998. ISBN 966-7492-00-1

Political history of Ukraine
Government of Ukraine
1917 in law
1917 documents
1917 in international relations
Dissolution of the Russian Empire
Ukrainian independence movement
1917 in Ukraine
June 1917 events